Qayah Dibi (also Romanized as Qayah Dībī; also known as Qayah Debī) is a village in Chahardangeh Rural District, Hurand District, Ahar County, East Azerbaijan Province, Iran. At the 2006 census, its population was 67, in 14 families.

References 

Populated places in Ahar County